Jeffrey R. Hanna (born July 11, 1947) is an American singer-songwriter and performance musician, best known for his association with the Nitty Gritty Dirt Band. His professional music career has spanned six decades.

Early life
Hanna was born in Detroit, Michigan. In 1962, he moved with his family to Long Beach, California. As a high school student there, he and some friends started a jug band that ultimately evolved into the Nitty Gritty Dirt Band.

Musical career
He was one of the founders and is the longest-serving member of the Nitty Gritty Dirt Band, where he has been a singer, songwriter, lead guitarist, drummer and washboard player. Through the years, he has been a major force in keeping the band together and maintaining its blend of folk, country and rock music.

Hanna has over 380 recording credits, primarily as a composer, but also as a vocalist, guitarist (acoustic, electric, steel, slide, twelve-string, and baritone), arranger, and producer.

In addition to the Nitty Gritty Dirt Band, his credits include work with artists such as Linda Ronstadt, Suzy Bogguss, The Texas Tenors, Patty Loveless, Rascal Flatts, Matraca Berg, Hannah Montana, Emmylou Harris, The Chieftains, Johnny Cash, June Carter Cash, Earl Scruggs, Michael Martin Murphey, Dickey Betts, and Steve Martin.

In 2006, his composition "Bless the Broken Road", co-written with Marcus Hummon and Bobby Boyd in 1994, won a Grammy Award for Best Country Song. It has been recorded by the Nitty Gritty Dirt Band, Marcus Hummon, and, in the Grammy year, Rascal Flatts.

Personal life
Hanna's children are visual artist Christopher Hanna, and Jaime Hanna of the Hanna-McEuen country music duo.

He has been married to Matraca Berg since December 5, 1993. The couple met while touring with Clint Black in the late 1980s. They live in Nashville, Tennessee.

References

Living people
1947 births
Nitty Gritty Dirt Band members
American folk singers
American male singer-songwriters
American country guitarists
American rock guitarists
American folk guitarists
Slide guitarists
Steel guitarists
Lead guitarists
American acoustic guitarists
American country rock singers
American country singer-songwriters
Grammy Award winners
American male guitarists
20th-century American guitarists
20th-century American male musicians
Singer-songwriters from Michigan